The Desert of Paran or Wilderness of Paran (also sometimes spelled Pharan or Faran; , Midbar Pa'ran), is a location mentioned in the Hebrew Bible. It is one of the places where the Israelites spent part of their 40 years of wandering after the Exodus, and was also a home to Ishmael, and a place of refuge for David. 

In Islamic tradition, it has often been equated with an area of the Hejaz.

Biblical Paran

The Wilderness or Desert of Paran is said to be the place where Hagar (the Egyptian servant girl of Abraham's wife Sarah/Sarai and, by Sarah's suggestion, was made his wife and bore him a son Ishmael) was sent into exile from Abraham's dwelling in Beersheba. Hagar "departed, and strayed in the wilderness of Beer-sheba":Then God opened her [Hagar's] eyes and she saw a well of water. So she went and filled the skin with water and gave the boy a drink. God was with the boy as he grew up. He lived in the desert and became an archer. While he was living in the Desert of Paran, his mother got a wife for him from Egypt.

Paran is later mentioned in the Book of Numbers as a place where the Israelites temporarily settled during the Exodus:

Then the Israelites set out from the Desert of Sinai and traveled from place to place until the cloud came to rest in the Desert of Paran. (see also )

Paran again features in the opening lines of the Book of Deuteronomy: These are the words Moses spoke to all Israel in the desert beyond the Jordan--that is, in the Arabah--opposite Suph, between Paran and Tophel, Laban, Hazeroth and Dizahab. 

He said: "The LORD came from Sinai and dawned over them from Seir; he shone forth from Mount Paran. He came with myriads of holy ones, from his right hand went a fiery law for them." 

King David spent some time in the wilderness of Paran after Samuel died.

 states that when Hadad the Edomite fled from Edom to Egypt, he passed through Midian and Paran on the way to Egypt.

It is not certain precisely where the wilderness of Paran is to be located. It is often associated with Mount Sinai in Egypt, and there is some evidence that it may originally have referred to the southern portion of the Sinai Peninsula. However the Deuteronomy 1:1 text suggests it could be east of the Jordan River.

Both Eusebius (in his Onomasticon, a Bible dictionary) and Jerome reported that Paran was a city in Paran desert, in Arabia Deserta (beyond Arabia Nabataea), southeast of Eilat Pharan. Onomasticon, under Pharan, states: "(Now) a city beyond Arabia adjoining the desert of the Saracens [who wander in the desert] through which the children of Israel went moving (camp) from Sinai. Located (we say) beyond Arabia on the south, three days journey to the east of Aila (in the desert Pharan) where Scripture affirms Ismael dwelled, whence the Ishmaelites. It is said (we read) also that (king) Chodollagomor cut to pieces those in 'Pharan which is in the desert'."   

(KJV)

Sebeos, the Armenian Bishop and historian, describing the Arab conquest of his time, wrote that the Arabs "assembled and came out from Paran".

in 1989, Professor Haseeb Shehada, in his translation of the Samaritan Torah, suggested an identification of the wilderness of Paran with the desert of Western Arabia, which is known today as the Hijaz.

Arab and Islamic traditions 
The Arab geographer Al-Muqaddasi mentioned in his book that the Red Sea branches into two "at the extremity of al-Hijaz at a place called Faran".

The association of Paran in Genesis 21:21 with Ishmael and the Ishmaelites is affirmed by the Muslim geographer Yaqut al-Hamawi who writes "Faran, an arabized Hebrew word, one of the names of Mecca mentioned in the Torah." Islamic and Arabic traditions hold that the wilderness of Paran is, broadly speaking, the Hejaz, the northern half of Tihamah, stretching along the east side of the Red Sea starting from Jordan and Sinai, and that the specific site where Ishmael settled is that of Mecca, near the mountains of Paran.

The "Desert of Paran" is also interpreted as Hijaz in an old Arabic translation of the Samaritan Pentateuch. When it was translated into English in 1851, it was found to include a footnote making this interpretation. The name 'Paran' or 'Faran' has often been used to refer specifically to the wilderness and mountains near where Mecca is situated. Al-Hamdani in his book Geography of the Arabic Peninsula says that the Paran mountains around Mecca were named after Paran son of Amalek. Sam'ni in his Book of Surnames also says that the surname Farani is derived from the Faran mountains near Mecca in Hijaz

According to Wahb ibn Munabbih, there was a Tal Faran ("Hill of Faran") on the outskirts of Mecca, mentioned in his book Kitab al-Tijan, a Pre-Islamic Arabic folklore compilation. Ibn Munabbih further suggested an identification for Tal Faran as the 'mound of the Two runaways', a place where the Jurhum tribe found Hagar and Ishmael and thought of them as two runaways.

Haggai Mazuz, a scholar of Islam associated with the Bar-Ilan University, asserts that Muslim polemicists' (like the Jewish convert Samawʾal al-Maghribī, 1125–1175 CE) appropriation of Deut. 33:2 has antecedence in Jewish tradition itself, as some Midrashim and Targumim, before the rise of Islam itself, posed a connection between Paran and Ishmael-Arabs. For instance, commentating on the Sifrei Debarīm, a halakhic midrash on Deuteronomy, dated from the 3rd to the 5th century CE, he says: the link between Paran and the Arabs (actually the Arabic language), who are also called Ishmaelites after Ishmael (among other names), is very early although somewhat vague.

See also
 Middle East
 Wadi Feiran, whose oasis was identified by Ptolemy as "Paran"

References

External links
 Baseinstitute.org
 A 16th century French map showing Paran

Book of Genesis
Book of Numbers
Book of Deuteronomy
Books of Samuel
Books of Kings
Book of Habakkuk
Hebrew Bible regions
Vayeira
Hejaz
Hagar
Deserts